The  is an electric multiple unit (EMU) train type on order by Tokyo Metropolitan Bureau of Transportation (Toei) for use on Toei Asakusa Line services in Japan from June 2018.

Design
The 5500 series were built by Japan Transport Engineering Company (J-TREC) as part of its "Sustina S13 Series" family of 18-metre-long, three-door stainless steel-bodied trains. In addition, they use energy-efficient three-phase induction motors controlled by two-level variable frequency drives using silicon carbide-based MOSFETs.

Operations
These trains are being used on the Toei Asakusa Line, Keikyu Main Line, Keikyu Airport Line, the Hokuso Line and the Keisei Line through services since 30 June 2018. They were introduced on Narita Sky Access Line services on 26 February 2022.

Formation
As of July 2021, the fleet consists of 27 eight-car trainsets. The formations consist of 6 motored ("M") cars, and two non-powered trailer ("T") cars. Car 1 is on the south end.

 Cars 3 and 6 each have two single-arm type pantographs.

Interior

History
Toei officially announced initial details of the new trains on 6 December 2016.

One eight-car set was delivered during fiscal 2017, and was to enter service in fiscal spring 2018. This will be followed by seven more sets in fiscal 2018, with 19 further sets delivered in subsequent years.

The trains entered service on 30 June 2018.

Gallery

References

External links

 Toei news release published in December 2016 
 J-TREC news release 

Electric multiple units of Japan
5500
Train-related introductions in 2018
J-TREC multiple units
1500 V DC multiple units of Japan